Pyrodes is a genus of beetles in the family Cerambycidae. It is monotypic, being represented by the single species Protorma nitidus.

Description
The basic coloration is metallic blue-green or purple-green. Pronotum and elytra are densely punctured, with a large ridge on each side of the thorax.

Distribution and habitat
This species can be found in Argentina, south-eastern Brazil and Paraguay.

References
 Miguel A. Monné, Larry G. Bezark & Frank T. Hovore Checklist of the Cerambycidae, or longhorned beetles (Coleoptera) of the Western Hemisphere
 Biolib
 F. Vitali nitidus Cerambycoidea
 World Field Guide

External links
 Pyrodes nitidus on Flickr
 Fauna Paraguay

Prioninae
Beetles described in 1787